The order of Assassins was founded in Persia in 1090 by Hassan-i Sabbah.  The list of Assassins associated with the order include the following:
al-Hakim al-Munajjim, the physician-astrologer (d. 1103)
 Abu Tahir al-Sa’igh, the goldsmith (d. 1113)
Bahram al-Da'i, nephew of al-Asterbadi (d. 1127)
 Rashid ad-Din Sinan (d. 1193)
 Sarim al-Din Mubarak, son-in-law of Baibars al-Bunduqdar, sultan of Egypt (fl. 1271)

Others
 Dihdar Bu-Ali (fl. 1090)
Mu'ayyad al-Din Muzaffar (fl. 1096)
Sharaf al-Din Muhammad, son of Mu'ayyad al-Din Muzaffar (after 1096)
Abu Ibrahim al-Asterbadi (d. 1101)
Ahmad ibn 'Abd al-Malik ibn Attāsh (d. after 1105)
 Ismail al-'Ajami (d. 1130)
 Ali ibn-Wafa (d. 1149)
 Abu-Muhammad (fl. 1162)
 Khwaja Ali ibn Mas'ud (fl. 1162)
 Abu Mansur, nephew of Abu-Muhammad (fl. 1162)
 Nasr al-'Ajami (fl. 1193)
 Kamāl ad-Din al-Hasan (fl. after 1221)
 Majd ad-Din (d. after 1227)
 Sirāj ad-Din Muzaffa ibn al-Husain (fl. 1227–1238)
 Taj ad-Din Abu'l-Futūh ibn Muhammad (d. after 1249)
 Radi ad-Din Abu'l-Ma'āli (fl. 1256)
 Najm ad-Din (d. 1274)
 Shams al-Din, son of Najm ad-Din (fl. 1274).

Note that this list does not include the da'i and Imams that ruled the Nizari Isma'ili State from 1090 to 1255, beginning with Hassan-i Sabbah.

References

 Baldwin, Marshall W., and Setton, Kenneth M. (1969), A History of the Crusades: Volume One, The First Hundred Years, Chapter IV: The Ismailites and the Assassins, The University of Wisconsin Press, Madison.
 Lewis, Bernard (2003). The Assassins: A Radical Sect in Islam. Perseus Books Group, London.

Order of Assassins
Medieval Syria
Mercenary units and formations of the Middle Ages
Isma'ilism-related lists